Interstate 77 (I-77) is a part of the Interstate Highway System that runs from Columbia, South Carolina, to Cleveland, Ohio. In North Carolina, I-77 enters the state at Charlotte, from South Carolina. Crossing the Piedmont, it connects with Statesville before continuing north into Virginia. The landscapes traversed by I-77 is a contrast of urban and rural foothills, with views of the Blue Ridge Mountains seen from a distance on its most northern section.

The freeway bears several names in addition to the I-77 designation. Throughout the state, the freeway is known as the Blue Star Memorial Highway, a name shared with multiple Interstates across the state. Starting at the South Carolina state line, it is known as the General Paul R. Younts Expressway, switching at Woodlawn Road to the Bill Lee Freeway, ending at the Mecklenburg–Iredell county line. In Surry County, it is known as the Charles M. Shelton Highway.

Not originally part of the Federal-Aid Highway Act of 1956, I-77 was added the following year as a route between Charlotte and Port Huron, Michigan, via Detroit, Michigan. In 1958, the routing was realigned toward Cleveland instead; the Detroit–Port Huron section became part of I-94. I-77 received two extension approvals; the first in 1964, continuing south from I-85 to US Route 74 (US 74), and the second in 1969 to the South Carolina state line toward Columbia. The Interstate was completed in 1977.

Route description 

I-77 begins at the South Carolina state line, near Fort Mill, in concurrency with US 21. I-77 goes through the city of Charlotte as a major north–south corridor, connecting Uptown Charlotte with the suburbs of Pineville, Huntersville, Cornelius, and Davidson. Shortly after entering North Carolina, it expands to six lanes. Between I-485 (exit 2) and I-277 (exit 9), the highway experiences massive traffic congestion during weekday rush hours (7:00–9:30 am/4:00–6:30 pm) due to commuter traffic. I-77 later encounters the other end of I-277 at exit 11, with the northbound carriageway briefly splitting from the southbound one and making an S-curve underneath I-277 due to the presence of left-hand exit ramps (southbound has a straight-through setup). Just north of Uptown Charlotte, I-77 makes a unique interchange configuration with I-85 (exit 13), with north and southbound lanes crisscrossing briefly. After I-485, I-77 reduces to five lanes (three lanes northbound), then to four lanes after Gilead Road (exit 23).

At Lake Norman, I-77 crosses into Iredell County and becomes a more suburban Interstate, passing through Mooresville and then Statesville, where it intersects with I-40. It gradually becomes more rural outside of Statesville, becoming entirely rural after exiting Iredell County. The final  of I-77 is concurrent with I-74 to the Virginia state line (where I-74 ends), all within view of the Blue Ridge Mountains.

Express lanes 
The I-77 Express lanes were financed, developed, and constructed and are operated and maintained by I-77 Mobility Partners, in a public–private partnership with the North Carolina Department of Transportation (NCDOT). The express lanes replaced the first and only HOV lanes in North Carolina, which existed from 2004–2015.

The express lanes begin with four lanes (two lanes for each direction) at Brookshire Freeway (exit 11), in Charlotte; reduce to two lanes (one lane for each direction) at Catawba Avenue (exit 28), in Cornelius; and end at NC 150 (exit 36), near Mooresville. There are two exits in the stretch that are exclusive to the express lanes: at Lakeview Road in Charlotte and at Hambright Road in Huntersville.

Only vehicles with two axles or motorcycles are allowed on the express lanes. Emergency vehicles when responding to emergencies and mass transit vehicles are exempt and are not tolled.

On June 1, 2019, the first portion of the I-77 Express lanes opened between Hambright Road in Huntersville and NC 150 in Mooresville. The remainder of the I-77 Express lanes south to I-277 in Charlotte were open in November 2019.

Tolls 
The express lanes uses all-electronic tolling, with tolls payable with a valid transponder (NC Quick Pass, E-ZPass, Peach Pass, or SunPass) or bill by mail, which uses automatic license plate recognition and charge a higher rate with additional fees. When the express lanes first opened in September 2018, they used a fixed rate based on the segment and time of day for the first 180 days of operation, with a total one-way rate range within $0.30–$11.00 with valid transponder.

, the total one-way northbound rate will range within $2.70–$70.45 and the total one-way southbound rate will range within $2.45–$58.00 with valid transponder.

HOV3+ 
Vehicles with three passengers or more may use the express lanes for free, provided they have a E-ZPass Flex Transponder or notify via the HOV mobile app/website, with at least 15 minutes before traveling. Violators are subject to a fine of up to $100 plus court costs; as well as two points against their driver's license for each HOV infraction. Motorcycle drivers with a valid transponder may use the express lanes for free.

History 

On August 4, 1959, the commission selected the routing of I-77 to run between I-85 in Charlotte and a point on the Virginia border in Elkin. That would change in late 1960 when the commission voted to route the highway just west of Mount Airy, saying the route would serve the most people.

With construction beginning in the 1960s, I-77 would gain additional mileage in October 1964 when a  extension was granted by the US Bureau of Public Roads. Instead of ending at I-85, I-77 now ended at Independence Boulevard (US 74) in Uptown Charlotte. Another extension was granted in the late 1960s that extended I-77 from Independence Boulevard to the South Carolina border. The latest extension also included a relocation of US 21 from the city's surface streets to the new Interstate.

I-77 opened to traffic in the following segments:
 1965: Yadkin and Surry counties (US-21 Elkin Bypass only).
 1966: A  stretch in Iredell County.
 1967: Stretches in Mecklenburg, Yadkin, and Iredell counties.
 1968: A stretch of highway in the Davidson and Cornelius areas in Mecklenburg and Iredell counties.

By 1972, I-77 was open from exit 28 (NC 73) to exit 73 north of Elkin. The last two sections of the highway to open to traffic was the stretch from Cornelius to Charlotte in 1975 and from exit 73 to the Virginia state line in 1977.

In April 2001, I-74 was overlapped with I-77 from the Virginia state line to exit 101.

On December 17, 2004, I-77 was widened to six-lanes with HOV lanes, between I-85 to the proposed location of I-485 (later opened December 8, 2008).

On June 28, 2013, a new interchange was added in Mooresville: exit 35 (Brawley School Road). The interchange was built with additional shoulder space and lights that will not need to be moved when I-77 is eventually widened in area.

In 2015, NCDOT signed a contract with I-77 Mobility Partners to begin construction and eventual management of the toll lanes starting in 2018. However, new criticism erupted before the financial agreement was made when local politicians discovered the contract was amended in 2014 giving I-77 Mobility Partners a 50-year noncompete clause. The clause eliminated any future widening of additional free-lanes between Uptown Charlotte and Mooresville, or, if any additional free-lanes were added, then NCDOT would have to pay the developer compensation. The toll lanes between Mooresville and Huntersville opened June 1, 2019, and the last sections leading into Uptown Charlotte opened November 23 of that year.

On February 1, 2018, NCDOT opened a new rest area located in the median of I-77, at milemarker 58. Construction of the  $15-million (equivalent to $ in ) facility started in early 2015. With the opening of the facility, four older rest areas in Iredell and Yadkin counties, built in 1972–1973, were closed.

On November 22, 2022, a news helicopter crashed near I-77 at Nations Ford Road in South Charlotte, killing pilot Chip Tayag and meteorologist Jason Myers, who were employees of local TV station WBTV.

Future 

I-77 is planned to have its existing southbound travel lanes widened (not add more lanes), between I-277/NC 16 (Brookshire Freeway) to I-85 in Charlotte. Estimated to cost $16.5 million, the purpose of the project is to widen the lanes back to proper Interstate standards as agreed with the Federal Highway Administration (FHWA), when NCDOT were given design exceptions when adding the HOV lanes in 2004. Construction began in late 2016.

, HOT lanes are being constructed along I-77. The project is broken into two parts: the first is constructing new travel lanes from I-485 interchange (exit 19) to West Catawba Avenue (exit 28), at an estimated cost of $57 million, and the second would be to convert the existing HOV lanes from Brookshire Boulevard (exit 11) to I-485 (exit 19). After completion, drivers and motorcyclists can still use the lane for free if qualified under HOV rules; noncompliant drivers will be charged a toll. In July 2019, NCDOT and the Charlotte Regional Transportation Planning Organization announced a project that would convert segments of I-77 shoulders to travel lanes to be used only during peak periods between I-485 and Mooresville.

Another set of HOT lanes is currently being studied along I-77 from south of Uptown Charlotte to the South Carolina border.

The I-40/I-77 interchange (exit 51) is undergoing a major upgrade in three phases: reconstruction of nearby intersections on both Interstates, reconstruction and widening of I-40/I-77 interchange, and construction of new ramps at the interchange. The estimated cost for the entire project is $251 million, and construction began in March 2012. It will replace the current interchange, which was built in the late 1960s.

Auxiliary route 
I-277 is the only auxiliary route in the state. The auxiliary route loops around uptown Charlotte.

Exit list

See also 
 Carowinds
 Interstate 74
 Lake Norman
 Lake Norman State Park
 Northlake Mall
 Uptown Charlotte

References

External links 

NCDOT: I-77 Express Lanes
NCRoads.com: I-77
North Carolina @ AARoads – Interstate 77

 North Carolina
77
Transportation in Mecklenburg County, North Carolina
Transportation in Iredell County, North Carolina
Transportation in Yadkin County, North Carolina
Transportation in Surry County, North Carolina
Transportation in Charlotte, North Carolina
High-occupancy toll roads